This article gives an overview of the Team3M cycling team during season 2016.

Overview 
 Main sponsor: 3M
 General manager: Bernard Moerman
 Team leaders: Frank Boeckx, Tim Lacroix, Walter Maes, Thierry Fevery
 Bicycles: Ridley

Team roster

External links 
 Team3M Officiële website
 Team3M op www.wvcycling.com

3M
2016 in Belgian sport